Meditative Story is a podcast that combines first-person stories with meditation prompts and original music, to create a mindfulness experience in audio. Variety describes Meditative Story as “part first-person narrative podcast and part guided meditation.”  The podcast is hosted by Rohan Gunatillake and has featured stories from Krista Tippett (host of the radio show On Being), NPR Host Peter Sagal, travel writer Pico Iyer, restaurateur Danny Meyer, LinkedIn cofounder Reid Hoffman, author A.J. Jacobs, Beautycon Media's Moj Mahdara, actor Josh Radnor, actor Catherine Reitman, NASA astronomer Michelle Thaller and MOMA curator Paola Antonelli, among others.

Meditative Story is created by WaitWhat, the media company led by former TED executives Deron Triff and June Cohen, and Thrive Global, a behavior change company led by Arianna Huffington.

History 
The idea for Meditative Story originated with the show's executive producer Deron Triff, who told Forbes “[We're] big believers in storytelling as a vehicle to transform people’s lives... We wanted to blend the storytelling experience with tools and strategies for mindfulness and wellness. Our first call went to Arianna and her team, and we embarked on this venture together." Huffington described the series as “a response to a deep cultural need in our hyper sped up world to have a moment to recharge."

The first episode of Meditative Story aired on July 29, 2019. Its first season ran through January 2020 and consisted of 26 weekly episodes,. Its second season ran from March 2020 to October 2020.

From 2022, the show is distributed by public media organization PRX's Dovetail publishing platform; PRX also provides sponsorship and promotional support.

Format 
Each episode of Meditative Story is narrated by a different well-known cultural figure, telling a personal story. Many of the stories center on a moment in time when everything changed for the storyteller; others reflect on a broad theme, like friendship, discovery or loss. The stories are set to original music, and punctuated by meditation prompts from the host Rohan Gunatillake, who also ends each episode with a guided meditation.

Episodes

Reception & Awards 
Meditative Story has received strong praise from Variety, Forbes, Wired, The Today Show, CBC Radio and others. Forbes describes it as "a completely new kind of listening experience that blends intimate first-person stories with mindfulness prompts, enveloped in beautiful music composition.” Meditative Story has made 38 appearances on the US Podcasts Chart, and was ranked #7 in August 2019. It was named one of the Top Podcasts of 2019 by Canada's CBC Radio

References

External links 
 

Audio podcasts
2019 podcast debuts